is a railway station on the Senmō Main Line in Koshimizu, Hokkaido, Japan, operated by the Hokkaido Railway Company (JR Hokkaido).

Lines
Hama-Koshimizu Station is served by the Senmō Main Line between Higashi-Kushiro and Abashiri. It is numbered B74.

Layout
The station is unstaffed, and consists of two side platforms serving two tracks.

History
It was renamed Hama-Koshimizu on 15 November 1952 due to its proximity to the beach at the town of Koshimizu.

Surroundings
  Route 244
 Abashiri Bus "Hama-Koshimizu Eki-mae" Bus Stop

References

External links
 JR Hokkaido Hama-Koshimizu Station information 

Railway stations in Japan opened in 1925
Stations of Hokkaido Railway Company
Railway stations in Hokkaido Prefecture